The 1938–39 Polska Liga Hokejowa season was the 10th season of the Polska Liga Hokejowa, the top level of ice hockey in Poland. Four teams participated in the final round, and Dab Katowice won the championship. To win promotion to the final round, Warszawianka beat Czarni Lwów, Ognisko beat ŁKS Łódź, and Polonia Warszawa beat AZS Poznań.

Qualification
 Dąb Katowice - KS Cracovia 2:0/1:1

Final Tournament

External links
 Season on hockeyarchives.info

Polska Hokej Liga seasons
Polska
1938–39 in Polish ice hockey